The Office of National AIDS Policy, established under President Clinton in 1993, coordinates the continuing domestic efforts to implement the President's National HIV/AIDS Strategy. In addition, the office works to coordinate an increasingly integrated approach to the prevention, care and treatment of HIV/AIDS. As a unit of the Domestic Policy Council, the Office of National AIDS Policy coordinates with other White House offices. It is led by a director, who is appointed by the president.

Following the inauguration of President Trump on January 20, 2017, the website for the Office of National AIDS Policy became inaccessible and it was reported the office was closed with the departure of the previous director, Amy Lansky, with no clear plans if or when President Trump planned to reopen it. In June 2017, six members of the council filed letters of resignation, citing that above all things the current administration "...simply does not care..." about the HIV/AIDS situation in the United States.

Function
The Office of National AIDS Policy is part of the White House Domestic Policy Council and is tasked with coordinating the continuing efforts of the government to reduce the number of HIV infections across the United States. The office emphasizes prevention through wide-ranging education initiatives and helps to coordinate the care and treatment of citizens with HIV/AIDS.

The Office of National AIDS Policy also coordinates with the National Security Council and the Office of the Global AIDS Coordinator at the Department of State, and works with international bodies to ensure that America's response to the global pandemic is fully integrated with other prevention, care, and treatment efforts around the world. Through the U.S. President's Emergency Plan for AIDS Relief (PEPFAR) initiative, the U.S. has taken steps in responding to the global HIV/AIDS pandemic, working with countries heavily impacted by HIV/AIDS to help expand access to treatment, care, and prevention.

National HIV/AIDS Strategy
In July 2010, President Obama released the National HIV/AIDS Strategy for the United States, the first comprehensive strategy to achieve a coordinated response to domestic HIV.  The National HIV/AIDS Strategy sought to reduce the number of new infections in the United States, improve health outcomes for people living with HIV, and reduce HIV-related disparities by coordinating the response across Federal agencies. The strategy was implemented across U.S. departments and agencies, including the Department Health and Human Services, Department of Justice, Department of Labor, Housing and Urban Development, and Department of Veterans Affairs. The strategy had four main goals:
 1) To reduce new HIV infections
 2) To increase access to care and improve health outcomes for people living with HIV
 3) To reduce HIV-related disparities
 4) To achieve a more coordinated response

List of directors of the Office of National AIDS Policy
 Parties

See also
 National Commission on AIDS
 Presidential Advisory Council on HIV/AIDS
 President's Commission on the HIV Epidemic
 President's Emergency Plan for AIDS Relief

References

External links
 Office of National AIDS Policy webpage
 AIDS.gov - The U.S. Federal Domestic HIV/AIDS Resource 
 HIVtest.org - Find an HIV testing site near you

HIV/AIDS organizations in the United States
AIDS Policy